Brent Barling (born April 28, 1961) is a former Canadian soccer player who played for Vancouver Whitecaps in the NASL.

Club career
Barling spent his whole career with the Vancouver Whitecaps.

International career
Barling played for the Canada men's national under-20 soccer team, making one appearance at the 1979 FIFA World Youth Championship.

Career statistics

Club

Notes

References

1961 births
Living people
Canadian soccer players
Canada men's youth international soccer players
Association football forwards
North American Soccer League (1968–1984) players
Vancouver Whitecaps (1974–1984) players
20th-century Canadian people